Billy Merasty (born 1960) is an Aboriginal Canadian actor and writer of Cree descent.

Early life
Merasty was born in Brochet, Manitoba, Canada. He is the ninth of fourteen siblings born to Viola and Pierre Merasty, and a grandson of Joe Highway, a famous caribou hunter and champion dogsled racer; and related to playwright Tomson Highway and dancer, choreographer, actor, and director René Highway.

Career 
Merasty moved to Toronto at the age of 18 in search of René Highway, who was then working for the Toronto Dance Theatre. At the age of 23, he launched his acting career after graduating from the Centre for Indigenous Theatre for aspiring First Nations artists. He then worked for the Native Earth Performing Arts for a long period.

Merasty has worked extensively on the stage and films as an actor and has written one play, Fireweed, produced in 1992. His second play, Godly's Divinia, is in development.

In 2010, Merasty received the Order of Manitoba (Order of the Buffalo Hunt) in recognition for his many years as an Aboriginal role model from Manitoba.

Stage work 
His stage credits include appearances in Tomson Highway's The Sage, The Dancer and the Fool, Dry Lips Oughta Move to Kapuskasing and The Rez Sisters, Daniel David Moses' The Indian Medicine Show, Lanford Wilson's Rain Dance, Marie Clements' Copper Thunderbird, Kevin Loring's Where the Blood Mixes, Steven Cole Hughes' Ghost Dance and David S. Craig's The Neverending Story.

In 2012, he performed the role of Gloucester in an all-aboriginal production of William Shakespeare's King Lear at the National Arts Centre in Ottawa, alongside a cast that also included August Schellenberg as Lear, Tantoo Cardinal as Regan, Jani Lauzon in a dual role as Cordelia and the Fool, and Craig Lauzon as Kent.

Filmography

Film

Television

References

External links
 

Canadian male stage actors
Canadian male film actors
Canadian male television actors
20th-century Canadian dramatists and playwrights
21st-century Canadian dramatists and playwrights
First Nations male actors
First Nations dramatists and playwrights
People from Northern Region, Manitoba
Living people
Cree people
1960 births
Canadian gay actors
Male actors from Manitoba
Writers from Manitoba
LGBT First Nations people
Canadian gay writers
Canadian LGBT dramatists and playwrights
Canadian male dramatists and playwrights
20th-century Canadian male writers
21st-century Canadian male writers
21st-century First Nations writers
21st-century Canadian LGBT people
Gay dramatists and playwrights